From Beyond the Grave is a 1974 British anthology horror film from Amicus Productions, directed by Kevin Connor, produced by Milton Subotsky and based on short stories by R. Chetwynd-Hayes.

It was the last in a series of anthology films from Amicus and was preceded by Dr Terror's House of Horrors (1965), Torture Garden (1967), The House That Dripped Blood (1970), Asylum, Tales from the Crypt (both 1972) and The Vault of Horror (1973).

Plot
Four customers buy or steal items from Temptations Limited, an antique shop whose motto is "Offers You Cannot Resist". A nasty fate awaits those who cheat the shop's proprietor (Peter Cushing).

The Gatecrasher
Edward Charlton (David Warner) buys an antique mirror for a knockdown price, believing that he has tricked the proprietor into accepting that it is a reproduction. Charlton holds a seance at the suggestion of his friends and falls into a trance. He finds himself in an other world where he is approached by a sinister figure (Marcel Steiner) who appears to stab him. Charlton wakes up screaming. Later the figure's face appears in the mirror and orders Charlton to kill so that he can "feed". Charlton butchers people until the apparition is able to manifest himself outside the mirror. The figure then explains that Charlton must do one more thing before the figure can walk abroad and join others like him. The figure says he will take Charlton "beyond the ultimate" and persuades Charlton to kill himself by impaling himself on a knife. The mirror stays in Charlton's flat for years after his death, until the latest owner also decides to hold a seance. Charlton's hungry spectre appears in the mirror.

An Act of Kindness
Christopher Lowe (Ian Bannen) is a frustrated middle-management drone trapped in a loveless marriage with Mabel (Diana Dors). Bullied by his wife, and shown no respect by his son, he befriends Jim Underwood (Donald Pleasence), an old soldier scratching out a living selling matches and shoelaces. Lowe tells Underwood that he is a decorated soldier, and subsequently attempts to persuade the proprietor of Temptations Ltd to sell him a Distinguished Service Order (DSO) medal, which is awarded to officers for meritorious or distinguished service, typically in actual combat, even though Lowe was merely a sergeant in the Pay Corps. The proprietor asks Lowe for the certificate that would prove that he has received the award, and Lowe steals the medal. Underwood is impressed by the medal, and asks Lowe to come to his house for tea. There Lowe meets Underwood's daughter, Emily (Angela Pleasence, Donald Pleasence's real-life daughter). Emily gradually seduces Lowe and they start an affair. Emily then produces a miniature doll of Mabel, and Lowe agrees that she should cut it. Lowe dashes home to find Mabel dead. Underwood and Emily then appear at Lowe's home, and walk in to the sound of the wedding march. Later, Emily and Lowe are married. Lowe's son (played by the future writer John O'Farrell) and Jim Underwood attend the wedding and the reception. Rather than cut the cake, Emily cuts into the head of the effigy of the groom on top of it. Lowe falls onto the table, dead. Underwood and Emily explain to Lowe's son that they always answer the prayers of a child "in one way or another".

The Elemental
Reggie Warren (Ian Carmichael), a businessman, enters Temptations Ltd and puts the price tag of a cheaper snuffbox in the one he wants to buy. The proprietor sells him the box at the lower price and says, "I hope you enjoy snuffing it." On the train home, a psychic, Madame Orloff (Margaret Leighton), advises Warren that he has an elemental on his shoulder. After Warren's dog disappears and his wife Susan (Nyree Dawn Porter) is attacked by an unseen force, he calls in Madame Orloff, who exorcises the elemental from Warren's home. Later, however, the Warrens hear noises upstairs. Reggie is knocked down and falls to the foot of the stairs, unconscious. When he wakes up he finds Susan possessed by the elemental, which tells Reggie that he has tried to deny it life, and then kills him before smashing through the front door.

The Door
William Seaton (Ian Ogilvy) is a writer who buys an ornate door from the proprietor. He is unable to meet the proprietor's asking price, but agrees a reduced price with him. When the proprietor goes to the back of the shop to note Seaton's details he leaves the till open. After Seaton leaves the proprietor starts counting the money in the till. Seaton's wife, Rosemary (Lesley-Anne Down) thinks that the door is too grand to lead to a stationery cupboard, but when she touches it she seems to be able to see what originally lay behind it. The door begins to exert a strange fascination over Seaton and he finds that when he opens it a mysterious blue room lies beyond. There he finds notes made by Sir Michael Sinclair (Jack Watson), an occultist who created the door as a means to trap those who pass through it, so that Sinclair can take their souls and live forever. Seaton escapes, but when he tries to leave his house he finds that the door's influence has spread, and he and Rosemary are trapped. In a trance Rosemary is unable to stop herself from opening the door and entering the room, where she is incapacitated by Sinclair. Sinclair carries her through the door, mocking Seaton by asking him to follow because two souls are better than one. Seaton starts to smash the door with an axe, and the room and Sinclair start to crumble. Seaton tries to rescue Rosemary, but Sinclair attacks him. Seaton has Rosemary continue chopping at the door and manages to break free. They destroy the room and turn Sinclair to a skeleton and then dust. Back at the shop the proprietor finishes counting the money and finds that none is missing.

Epilogue
Between the segments a shady character (Ben Howard) is seen casing the shop. At the end he enters and persuades the proprietor to hand him two loaded antique pistols. He then tries to rob the proprietor, who refuses to hand him any money and walks towards him. The thief shoots, but finds that bullets cannot stop the proprietor. Terrified, the thief staggers back, is hit by a swinging skeleton, falls into what appears to be a combination of a coffin and an iron maiden, and is spiked to death. "Nasty", the proprietor says. The proprietor then welcomes the viewer as his next customer, explains that he caters for all tastes, and says that each purchase comes with "a big novelty surprise".

Cast
Peter Cushing as Temptations Ltd, antiques and objets d'art, shop proprietor
Donald Pleasence as Jim Underwood, ex-serviceman and pedlar 
Angela Pleasence (Donald Pleasence's daughter) as Emily Underwood, Jim Underwood's daughter
Ian Bannen as Christopher Lowe, office manager and former sergeant in the Pay Corps
Diana Dors as Mabel Lowe, Christopher Lowe's disgruntled wife
Nyree Dawn Porter as Susan Warren, Reggie Warren's wife, "hot stuff" according to Madam Orloff
David Warner as Edward Charlton
Ian Ogilvy as William Seaton
Ian Carmichael as Reggie Warren
Lesley-Anne Down as Rosemary Seaton, William Seaton's wife
Jack Watson as Sir Michael Sinclair
Margaret Leighton as Madam Orloff, a clairvoyant 
John O'Farrell as Stephen Lowe, Christopher and Mabel Lowe's son
Marcel Steiner as the Mirror Demon
Wendy Allnutt as Pamela
Rosalind Ayres as Edward's first victim, a prostitute
Tommy Godfrey as Mr Jeffries
Ben Howard as Burglar

Production
Kevin Connor says that he got the job as director after Milton Subotsky read some scripts he had adapted with some friends. Subotsky took four of them, linked them, and offered Connor the job. Connor pointed out that he had never directed a film before, but Subotsky argued that editors made the best directors. Connor says that the film's budget was "" [sic]. In the early 70s the film business was in the doldrums and we could get a superb cast for almost minimum Equity." It was one of a number of horror movies starring Diana Dors.

Critical reception 
Allmovie's review of the film is generally favourable: "The last of the Amicus anthologies is a fun, old-fashioned example of the form."

See also
 List of British films of 1974

References

External links

1974 films
1974 directorial debut films
1974 horror films
Amicus Productions films
British horror anthology films
British supernatural horror films
British ghost films
1970s English-language films
Films about spirit possession
Films directed by Kevin Connor
Films scored by Douglas Gamley
1970s British films